Traematosisis is a monotypic genus of American sheet weavers containing the single species, Traematosisis bispinosus. It was first described by S. C. Bishop & C. R. Crosby in 1938, and is only found in the United States.

See also
 List of Linyphiidae species (Q–Z)

References

Linyphiidae
Monotypic Araneomorphae genera
Spiders of the United States